was a Japanese punk metal band formed in Tokyo in 1981. Although the guitar style resembled heavy metal in many aspects, GISM was one of the first Japanese hardcore bands, while at the same time drawing influence from the early industrial/avant-garde music scene—something uncommon in punk bands at that time. The acronym GISM has many different variations; they include: "Guerrilla Incendiary Sabotage Mutineer" (original), "God In the Schizoid Mind", "Grand Imperialism Social Murder", "Genocide Infanticide Suicide Menticide", "Gay Individual Social Mean", "Gothic Incest Sex Machine", "Grubby Incest Stripper Mastitis", "Gravity Impel Slaying Machine", "Get Incinerated Sorrow Mass", "Gore Impromptu Suicide Mine", "Grim Iconic Sadistic Mantra"  and "Gnostic Idiosyncrasy Sonic Militant".

GISM had attained a cult status in the international punk scene, duly for their unique blend of heavy metal and hardcore punk. Roadrunner Records ranked Sakevi Yokoyama No. 49 out of 50 of The Greatest Metal Frontmen of All Time.

Biography

Career
GISM had their first performance in 1981 at the University of Tokyo.

In 1983, GISM released their first album, titled Detestation, on Dogma Records. The album has been applauded for having unique vocals and a guitar style that was very uncommon in hardcore punk.

M.A.N., or Military Affairs Neurotic, was released in 1987 on Beast Arts Records. The album was quite a departure from the 'Detestation' album, putting more emphasis on a slower, metal style of music compared to the hardcore punk sound of the previous release.

GISM released their last album on compact disc, titled SoniCRIME TheRapy, in 2001. The band featured Kiichi Takahashi on bass and Ironfist Tatsushima on drums. Guitarist Randy Uchida died from cancer on 10 February 2001, shortly after the release of the album. GISM played two shows in Tokyo in honor of Randy Uchida, and then broke up.

In 2002, GISM made the cover of Burst Magazine (issue No. 49), an underground Japanese magazine.

GISM performed in the Netherlands on 15 April 2016 at Lee Dorian's Roadburn event. It was their first performance after a 13-year hiatus, along with being their first show outside of Japan.

Members and other projects
Sakevi Yokoyama continues to make collage art with his own clothing brand "stlTH", which makes T-shirt designs. In 1987, he made a cameo appearance in the Japanese film Robinson's Garden. In the movie, he attacks a Rastafarian man for teaching children spirituality. This film is the only documentation of his "acting" career. In 2004, Sakevi released a solo album titled The War under the name S.K.V. In 2006, he designed the artwork for World Burns To Death's album titled Totalitarian Sodomy.

Randy Uchida (guitarist) and Tohru Hiroshima (drummer) played with Ronny Wakamats and Michel Hammer in a side project called R.U.G. (Randy Uchida Group), which released one vinyl EP titled “Deathly Fighter” in 1984. Uchida died of cancer in 2001, and Hiroshima in 2022.

Kiichi Takahashi (bassist) was the vocalist for the occult heavy metal band Sabbrabells.

Cloudy (original bassist) played bass for female-fronted speed metal band Front Guerrilla, which released an EP titled Fight Back in 1986.

Ironfist Tatushima (drummer) continues to play in the bands Die You Bastard! and Crow, which he had been playing with prior to GISM.

Kaori Komura (original drummer) is an improviser using Korean percussion. She released a duo CD with Kazumoto Endo titled "In The Cave" in 2020.

P.O.W. magazine
During the mid 80s, Sakevi published a Japanese punkzine titled P.O.W. The acronym of P.O.W. initially stood for Punk On Wave, but then changed to Performance Of War for the third, final issue. The magazine promoted local punk bands from the Tokyo scene at the time. Sakevi also personally interviewed the Tokyo Medical Examiners Office, wrote the P.L.O., and wrote prisoners of war from Anti Japanese Armed Fronts by asking them all their opinions on death, included vivid instructions on different ways to kill people and showed vivid drawings on how ABC weapons are made with images of their horrific consequences. John Duncan, the guest-editor for the magazine, stated in the introduction of the third issue that Sakevi attacked a salaryman for staring with a makeshift flamethrower on a Tokyo commuter train, subsequently landing him in prison.

Discography

LPs
 Detestation (1983) Dogma Records
 M.A.N. (Military Affairs Neurotic) (1987) Beast Arts

CDs
 DETESTation (1992) Beast Arts
 SoniCRIME TheRapy (2002) Beast Arts

Compilations
 Outsider LP (1982, City Rocker) Tracks: "Incest", "Gash, Bite, Snatch", "AAHB"
 Great Punk Hits LP (1983, Japan Records) Tracks: "Death Exclamations", "Fire"
 Hardcore Unlawful Assembly LP (1984, AA records) Tracks: "Still Alive", "Nervous Corps"
 International P.E.A.C.E. Benefit Compilation 2x LP (1984, R Radical records) Track: "Endless Blockads for the Pussyfooter"
 The Punx cassette tape (1985, JICC) Tracks: "Shoot to Kill (for epileptic soldier)", "GISM"
 Determination (2015) Beast Arts

Videos
 "Performance" (1985) Beast Arts
 "BOOTLEG 1986" (1986) Beast Arts
 "Gay Individual Social Mean - Subj & Egos, chopped" (1995) Beast Arts
 "+R, Regicide Reverberation" (2002) Beast Arts

References

External links
GISM Fan site I
GISM at Metal Archives
A review of GISM - Detestation
 
 

Japanese heavy metal musical groups
Musical groups from Tokyo
Musical groups established in 1981
Musical groups disestablished in 2002
Musical quartets
Japanese crust and d-beat groups